Waiting is a children's picture book by American author and illustrator Kevin Henkes. Waiting was published by HarperCollins in 2015.

About the book
Waiting is a 2016 Caldecott Honor book, a Theodor Seuss Geisel Honor Book as well as a New York Times best-selling book. Waiting teaches children the seasons, new games and friendships. Waiting also teaches children the importance of waiting in ways that children can learn but also have fun while doing so. The author uses very soft touches of brown, green and blue colors to make very soft rounded shapes.

Plot
Five toys sit on a windowsill all waiting for something to happen. There is an owl waiting to see the moon, there is a pig with an umbrella waiting to see the rain, there is a puppy with a snow sled waiting to see the snow, there is a bear with a kite waiting to see the wind, and finally there is a rabbit looking outside the window just happy to contemplate what is happening outside.

References

2015 children's books
American children's books
American picture books
Children's fiction books
Caldecott Honor-winning works
English-language books
Books about bears
Books about dogs
Fictional owls
Books about rabbits and hares
Books about pigs
Sentient toys in fiction
Fictional quintets
Children's books about friendship
United States in fiction
Works about seasons